Luis Macas Ambuludí (born 1951) is a Kichwa politician and intellectual from Saraguro Ecuador.

Macas has honorary university degrees in anthropology, linguistics and jurisprudence. He was one of the founders of the CONAIE and of the Pachakutik Movement, and was member of the National Congress of Ecuador. In 2003 he joined Lucio Gutiérrez's government as Minister of Agriculture, quit because of disagreements with his neoliberal policies.

Macas was vice-president of the CONAIE (Confederación de Nacionalidades Indígenas de Ecuador) from 1988 to 1991, and CONAIE president from 1991 to 1996 and from 2004–2008.

On May 24, 2006 Macas was proclaimed by the Pachakutik Movement as presidential candidate for the October 15, 2006 election. He came in seventh (out of 13 candidates), with just over 2 percent of the vote.

References

Related videos
Globalization from Below. Lecture given by Luis Macas, Ecuadoran Indigenous Leader and Human Rights Activist. November 16, 2006. University of Illinois at Urbana-Champaign.

External links
Luis Macas Home Page
CONAIE.org
Entretiens avec Luis Macas

1951 births
Living people
Ecuadorian people of Quechua descent
Members of the National Congress (Ecuador)
Agriculture ministers of Ecuador
Confederation of Indigenous Nationalities of Ecuador politicians
Pachakutik Plurinational Unity Movement – New Country politicians
Goldman Environmental Prize awardees